Ioannis Komitoudis (born 3 January 1938) is a Greek sprinter. He competed in the men's 4 × 100 metres relay at the 1960 Summer Olympics.

References

1938 births
Living people
Athletes (track and field) at the 1960 Summer Olympics
Greek male sprinters
Olympic athletes of Greece
Place of birth missing (living people)
20th-century Greek people